Ahn Byung-Keon (born 8 December 1988) is a South Korean football player who currently plays for Saigon FC in the V.League 1.

References 

 Bali united resmi kontrak Ahn Byung Keon

External links 
 

1988 births
Living people
Bali United F.C. players
Jeonnam Dragons players
K League 2 players
South Korean expatriates in Indonesia
South Korean footballers
Footballers from Seoul
Association football defenders